Rocaglamide is a natural product which belongs to a class of molecules called flavaglines. This compound was isolated in 1982 by King, Ming-Lu (金明儒) and colleagues based on its antileukemic activity. The name of Rocaglamide is named from two parts: Roc- and aglamide. Roc- means Republic of China(中華民國), the place in which this product isolated; aglamide indicates this product is isolated from Large-leaved Aglaia (Scientific name: Aglaia rimosa).  Like other flavaglines, rocaglamide displays potent insecticidal, antifungal, anti-inflammatory and anticancer activities. Rocaglamide A (RocA) inhibits eukaryotic translation initiation by binding to the translation initiation factor eIF4A and converting it into a translational repressor.

Rocaglamide was first synthesized by Barry Trost in 1990. Although other syntheses have been described since, Trost’s remains the only one to afford rocaglamide in an enantio-specific manner.

See also 
 FL3 (flavagline)
Eukaryotic translation
eIF4A
Silvestrol

References 

Carboxamides